Belfort station is the railway station serving the town Belfort, Territoire de Belfort department, eastern France.

Services
Belfort is served by regional trains of TER Grand Est and TER Bourgogne-Franche-Comté. Destinations served include:

 
 
 
 

References

External links

Optymo bus company timetables 

Buildings and structures in Belfort
Railway stations in France opened in 1858
Railway stations in Territoire de Belfort